Vilgelm Georgiyevich Knorin (Latvian: Vilhelms "Vilis" Knoriņš; (29 August 1890 – 29 July 1939) was a Latvian Bolshevik revolutionary, Soviet politician, publicist and historian.

Knorin was born in to a Latvian peasant family and was a member of the Bolshevik Party from 1910.

He served as the second First secretary of the Central Committee of the Communist Party of the Byelorussian SSR from 1920 to 1922 and from 1927 to 1928. 

Being a Moscow-appointed de facto head of state of Belarus, Knorin is known for his notorious quote about the Belarusian independence: "We believe that Byelorussians are not a nation, and the ethnographic specifics, which differentiate them from Russians, must be erased. We, communists, in the region that you call Byelorussia, work without thinking of what tribe we are."

From 1926 to 1927 he was head of the propaganda department of the Central Committee of the All-Union Communist Party. In April-July 1934 he was executive editor of the Bolshevik journal.

From August 1935 to 1937 he was deputy head of the department of party propaganda and agitation of the Central Committee of the All-Union Communist Party. Knorin participated in the preparation of the "History of the Communist Party of the Soviet Union (Bolsheviks)".

At the same time, from 1928 to 1937, he was an employee of the Comintern. He headed the information and propaganda department of the Comintern.

He was executed in the Great Purge as a part of the Latvian Operation of the NKVD. 

Knorin was posthumously rehabilitated in December 1955. 

A street in Minsk is named after Knorin.

References

External links
 

1890 births
1939 deaths
People from Cēsis Municipality
People from Kreis Wenden
Russian Social Democratic Labour Party members
Communist Party of Poland politicians
Old Bolsheviks
Latvian communists
Central Committee of the Communist Party of the Soviet Union members
Central Executive Committee of the Soviet Union members
Socialist Soviet Republic of Byelorussia people
Heads of the Communist Party of Byelorussia
Head of Propaganda Department of CPSU CC
Soviet historians
Latvian Operation of the NKVD
Great Purge victims from Latvia
Executed politicians
Soviet rehabilitations

Latvian historians
Latvian Marxists